Miss Brewster's Millions  is a 1926 American silent comedy film produced by Famous Players-Lasky and distributed by Paramount Pictures. Clarence G. Badger directed and the ever-popular Bebe Daniels starred. It was based on the 1902 novel by George Barr McCutcheon and a 1906 play adaptation of the same name by Winchell Smith and Byron Ongley, which had been filmed before in 1921 with Roscoe Arbuckle.

Plot
Polly Brewster, a penniless Hollywood extra, inherits one million dollars from her recently deceased father. However, young lawyer Tom Hancock informs her that she cannot spend the money but must invest it. Her Uncle Ned Brewster arrives and in revenge for indignities his brother made him suffer, he offers Polly his entire fortune of $5 million on the condition that she spend the inherited million within 30 days or less. Polly gleefully sets about investing, gives a great ball and fashion show, and runs down a man with her car and has him sue for a large sum. However, when the deadline arrives, Uncle Ned proves to be penniless; there is no  $5 million to be inherited. However, Polly finds that her investment in a motion picture company has yielded a handsome return, and she finds happiness with Tom.

Cast
Bebe Daniels as Polly Brewster
Warner Baxter as Thomas B. Hancock Jr.
Ford Sterling as Ned Brewster
André de Beranger as Mr. Brent
Miss Beresford as Landlady

Preservation status
Miss Brewster's Millions is now considered a lost film.

References

External links

Progressive Silent Film List: Miss Brewster's Millions at silentera.com
Lobby poster

American silent feature films
Lost American films
Films directed by Clarence G. Badger
American films based on plays
Films based on American novels
Films based on adaptations
American black-and-white films
Films based on Brewster's Millions
Films based on multiple works
1926 comedy films
1926 lost films
Lost comedy films
Silent American comedy films
1920s American films
1920s English-language films